The 2007–08 NCAA Division I men's ice hockey season began on October 7, 2007 and ended with the 2008 NCAA Division I men's ice hockey tournament's championship game on April 12, 2008 at Pepsi Center in Denver, Colorado. Boston College won their third NCAA Division I Men's Ice Hockey Championship, defeating Notre Dame 4–1 in the national championship game. This was the 61st season in which an NCAA ice hockey championship was held and is the 114th year overall where an NCAA school fielded a team.

Pre-season polls

The top 20 from USCHO.com/CSTV and the top 15 from USA Today/USA Hockey Magazine, both released on October 1, 2007.

Regular season

Standings

2008 NCAA tournament

Note: * denotes overtime period(s)

Player stats

Scoring leaders
The following players led the league in points at the conclusion of the season.

  
GP = Games played; G = Goals; A = Assists; Pts = Points; PIM = Penalty minutes

Leading goaltenders
The following goaltenders led the league in goals against average at the end of the regular season while playing at least 33% of their team's total minutes.

GP = Games played; Min = Minutes played; W = Wins; L = Losses; OT = Overtime/shootout losses; GA = Goals against; SO = Shutouts; SV% = Save percentage; GAA = Goals against average

Awards

NCAA

Atlantic Hockey

CCHA

CHA

ECAC

Hockey East

WCHA

See also
 2007–08 NCAA Division III men's ice hockey season

References

External links
USCHO.com

 
NCAA